Neftyanik Leninogorsk was an ice hockey team based in Leninogorsk, Russia.

History
The club was founded in 1961 and participated in the second and third level leagues during Soviet times.

In the 1998–99 season, the club played in the second-level league organized by the Russian Ice Hockey Federation. From 2000-2009, they took part in the second-level league, the Vysshaya Liga.

Neftyanik Leninogorsk was disbanded due to financial problems in 2009.

External links
 Club profile on eurohockey.com

Ice hockey teams in Russia
Ice hockey clubs disestablished in 2009
Ice hockey clubs established in 1961
Sport in Tatarstan